Francesco Bona (born 19 December 1983) is a former Italian male long-distance runner who competed at individual senior level at the 2009 IAAF World Half Marathon Championships.

He won a medal at the 2009 Summer Universiade.

Biography
After the end of his sports career, Bona worked as an engineer in his hometown of Biella.

National titles
He won a national championships at individual senior level.
Italian Athletics Championships
Half marathon: 2011

See also
Italian team at the running events

References

External links
 

1983 births
Living people
Italian male long-distance runners
Italian male marathon runners
Athletics competitors of Centro Sportivo Aeronautica Militare
Universiade medalists in athletics (track and field)
Universiade bronze medalists for Italy
Medalists at the 2009 Summer Universiade